Benjamin Martin (born 1969) is a New Zealand chess player and mathematician. He was awarded the title International Master (IM) by FIDE in 1996.

Chess career
Martin has represented New Zealand in four Chess Olympiads, in Novi Sad 1990, Manila 1992, Yerevan 1996, and Istanbul 2000. His best result was in 1996 when he scored 8/14.

Martin jointly won the New Zealand Chess Championship with Ortvin Sarapu in 1989/90.

Mathematics
Martin was an associate professor in the department of mathematics at the University of Auckland 2011–2014.  His research interests include algebraic groups and quantum field theory. He is now a professor in the department of mathematics at the University of Aberdeen, holding a personal chair.

References

External links

Benjamin Martin games at 365Chess.com

1969 births
Living people
Chess International Masters
New Zealand chess players
Chess Olympiad competitors
Academic staff of the University of Auckland
Date of birth missing (living people)
Place of birth missing (living people)